Chryseobacterium takakiae  is a Gram-negative, rod-shaped and non-spore-forming bacteria from the genus of Chryseobacterium which has been isolated from the moss Takakia lepidozioides from the Gawalong glacier in Tibet in China.

References

Further reading

External links
Type strain of Chryseobacterium takakiae at BacDive -  the Bacterial Diversity Metadatabase

takakiae
Bacteria described in 2015